Amirabad-e Sisakht (also Romanized as Amīrābād-e Sīsakht; also known as Amīrābād) is a village in Dana Rural District, in the Central District of Dana County, Kohgiluyeh and Boyer-Ahmad Province, Iran. At the 2006 census, its population was 271, in 61 families.

References 

Populated places in Dana County